Selayar Strait separates Selayar Island from Cape Bira of the main island South Sulawesi Province, Indonesia.  Within the strait lies Kambing Island and Pulau Pasitanete.
Ferry is operating between islands in Selayar Strait.

References 

Straits of Indonesia
Landforms of South Sulawesi
Landforms of Sulawesi
Greater Sunda Islands